The Last Chance is a 1968 Italian spy film written and directed by  and starring  Tab Hunter. It was the last film of Daniela Bianchi, who married shortly later and abandoned showbusiness to  devote herself to her family. It is also the only spy film of Carlo Delle Piane, but his scenes were removed from the final cut.

Plot

Cast 

  Tab Hunter  as   Patrick Harris
  Daniela Bianchi  as  Helen Harris
  Michael Rennie  as  George McConnell 
  Luisa Baratto as  Stephanie McConnell 
  Umberto Raho  as  Carlo 
  Luciano Rossi  as  Besive  
  Bill Vanders  as  Clark
  Franco Ressel  as  Inspector 
  Mario Maranzana

References

External links

Italian spy thriller films
1960s spy thriller films
Films directed by Giuseppe Rosati
Films scored by Carlo Rustichelli
1960s Italian-language films
English-language Italian films
1960s English-language films
1960s Italian films